The Fischer–Saller Scale, named for Nazi eugenicist Eugen Fischer and German anthropologist , is used in physical anthropology and medicine to determine the shades of hair color. The scale uses the following designations:

Earlier scale
An earlier version of the scale created by Eugen Fischer, known as the Fischer Scale, used a different range of designations:

See also
 Human hair color

References

Hair color
Biological anthropology
Color scales
Nazi eugenics